Italian Studies is an interdisciplinary field dealing with the study of the Italian language, literature, art, history, politics, culture and society.

List of academic institutions offering Italian Studies programmes outside of Italy

Australia

 Department of Italian Studies at University of Melbourne;
 Department of Languages and Culture at La Trobe University;
 Department of European Languages at Monash University;
 Department of Italian Studies at University of Sydney;
 Department of Italian Studies at The Australian National University;
 Department of Italian Studies at Flinders University;
 Department of Italian Studies at Griffith University;
 Department of Italian Studies at University of Western Australia;
 Department of Languages and Culture at University of Queensland;

Canada

 Department of Italian Studies at University of Toronto;
 Department of Language Studies at University of Toronto Mississauga;
 Department of Italian Studies at McGill University;
 Department of Modern Languages and Literatures at Université de Montréal;
 Department of Modern Languages and Literatures at University of Ottawa;
 Department of French, Hispanic and Italian Studies at University of British Columbia;
 Department of Spanish and Italian at Queen's University;
 Department of Modern Languages and Cultural Studies at University of Alberta;
 Department of Modern Languages, Literatures, and Cultures Brock University;

China

 Department of Italian Studies at University of International Business and Economics;
 School of European Languages and Culture at Beijing Foreign Studies University
 Department of Italian at Nankai University

Croatia
 Department of Italian Studies at University of Rijeka

Japan

 Department of Italian Linguistics at Kyoto Sangyo University;

Lithuania

 Department of Italian Linguistics and Literature at Vilnius University Faculty of Philology;

Slovenia
 Italian Studies at University of Primorska

South Africa

 Department of Italian at University of the Witwatersrand

United Kingdom

 Italian Studies at Oxford University;
 Department of Italian at Cambridge University;
 Department of Italian Studies at Manchester University;
 Department of Italian at University College London;
 Department of Italian at Leeds University;
 Department of Italian at Warwick University;
 Department of Italian at Reading University;
 Department of Italian at St. Andrews University;
 Department of Italian at Bristol University;
 Department of Languages and International Studies at Nottingham Trent University;

United States

 Department of Italian Studies at Georgetown University;
 Department of Italian Studies at the College of William & Mary;
Department of Italian Studies at New York University (Casa Italiana Zerilli-Marimò);
Department of Italian Studies at Brown University;
 Department of Italian Studies at University of California, Berkeley;
 Department of Italian at University of California, Los Angeles;
 Department of Italian at Columbia University;
 Italian Academy for Advanced Studies (Casa Italiana);
 Department of Italian at Yale University;
 Department of French and Italian at The University of Texas at Austin
 Department of French and Italian at University of Wisconsin;
 Department of French and Italian at Stanford University;
 Department of French and Italian at Princeton University;
 Department of French and Italian at Indiana University;
 Department of French and Italian at Ohio State University;
 Department of Romance Studies at Duke University
 Department of Romance Studies at Cornell University
 Department of Romance Languages and Literatures at Harvard University;
 Department of Romance Languages and Literatures at University of Chicago;
 Department of Romance Languages and Literatures at University of Michigan;
 Department of Romance Languages and Literatures at University of Notre Dame;
 Casa Italiana at the Nazareth College.
 Department of Romance Languages at University of Pennsylvania;
 Department of Romance Studies at Boston University;
 Department of Romance studies at The University of North Carolina at Chapel Hill;

Non-Italian Italian Studies Associations

The American Association for Italian Studies

The American Association for Italian Studies (AAIS) was founded in 1988. Its purpose is to encourage, support, and conduct research activities in Italian culture, including areas such as Italian language, art, music, history, literature, folklore, and popular culture, and well as its influence on other cultures.

Members of the Association are individuals either holding a Ph.D or Laurea in an area of Italian studies or an equivalent degree in Italian Studies; holding an academic position at the University or College level; enrolled in an advanced degree program in an area of Italian Studies above the master's degree Level.

The AAIS holds an annual meeting and periodically publishes a scholarly journal called Italian Culture.

The Association for the Study of Modern Italy

The Association for the Study of Modern Italy was founded in 1982 by Christopher Seton-Watson, to bring together individuals and organisations from the UK and abroad with teaching, research, professional or general interests in modern Italy from all disciplinary angles.

Today, ASMI’s membership is international and includes scholars and others from a wide range of disciplinary backgrounds including history, political science, languages, geography, literature and anthropology.

ASMI publishes a quarterly journal called Modern Italy.

The Canadian Association for Italian Studies

The Canadian Association for Italian Studies (CAIS, formerly known as the Canadian Society for Italian Studies or CSIS) was established in 1972, to foster and advance Italian studies in Canada and in the larger global community.

The CAIS aim is to provide a forum for the exchange of ideas through the presentation and discussion of papers that deal with diverse aspects of Italian language, literature, pedagogy, society, and culture. The CAIS publishes a biannual  Journal called Quaderni d’italianistica.

The Society for Italian Studies

The Society for Italian Studies (SIS) is a registered charity that strives "...to advance public education by furthering the study of Italy, Italian language, literature, thought, history, society and arts in the United Kingdom and Ireland."
It does this through publications,  conferences and its Annual General Meeting and Colloquium. It also publishes a bi-annual journal called Italian Studies.

Association of Professional Italianists in South Africa / Associazione di Professori d’Italiano in Sudafrica (API)

The purpose of A.P.I. (Association of Professional Italianists / Associazione Professori d’Italiano), established in 1981 in Johannesburg, is to promote cultural exchanges and discussions on didactic and literary topics concerning the preservation and teaching of the Italian language and literature in Southern Africa both at school and university level, and to keep abreast with international developments in this field.

API publishes a bi-annual journal called Italian Studies in Southern Africa / Studi d’Italianistica nell’Africa Australe (ISSA).

International scholarly Journals

Annali d’Italianistica
Annali d’Italianistica seeks to promote the study of Italian literature in its cultural context, to foster scholarly excellence, and to select topics of interest to a large number of Italianists. Monographic in nature, the journal is receptive to a variety of topics, critical approaches, and theoretical perspectives.

Contemporary Italian Politics
Contemporary Italian Politics, formerly Bulletin of Italian Politics, is a political science journal aimed at academics and policy makers as well as others with a professional or intellectual interest in the politics of Italy.

Forum Italicum
Forum Italicum is a peer-reviewed international journal of Italian Studies based at Stony Brook University, NY, USA, and founded by M. Ricciardelli in 1967. The journal is intended as a meeting-place where scholars, critics, and teachers can present their views on the literature, language, and culture of Italy and other countries in relation to Italy. Young and hitherto unpublished scholars are encouraged to contribute their critical works.

Italian Culture
Italian Culture is the official publication of the American Association for Italian Studies and is currently housed at the University of Minnesota and Cornell University. Its interdisciplinary scope reflects the broad and diverse interests of the Association's members, offering subscribers scholarly articles in Italian language, linguistics, history, literature, cinema, politics, philosophy, folklore, popular culture, migration, and the influence of Italy on other cultures. It also includes articles on comparative literature and cultural studies.

Italian Poetry Review
Italian Poetry Review, is a plurilingual journal of creativity and criticism that is part of a larger cultural program located at Columbia University in the City of New York and associated with the Department of Italian and the Italian Academy for Advanced Studies in America.

Italian Quarterly
Italian Quarterly is published by the Department  of Italian at Rutgers, the State University of New Jersey. The Journal welcomes critical contributions in English or Italian on Italian literature and culture, including film; artistic translations of work of merit; and original work, poetry or prose, in Italian.

Modern Italy
Modern Italy is the official journal of the Association for the Study of Modern Italy. Founded in 1995, the journal’s focus is the history, politics and social, economic and cultural studies of Italy, Italian affairs and the Italian peoples from the eighteenth to the twenty-first century. The journal publishes fully refereed research articles, a regular ‘Contexts and Debates’ section, review articles, book reviews, conference reports and exhibition reviews.

Journal of Modern Italian Studies
The Journal of Modern Italian Studies (JMIS) is one of the leading English language forums for debate and discussion on modern Italy. This peer-reviewed journal publishes five issues a year, each containing scholarly articles, book reviews and review essays relating to the political, economic, cultural, and social history of modern Italy from 1700 to the present.

Spunti e ricerche
Spunti e ricerche  is an academic journal based in Melbourne founded in 1985 and with a circulation to individuals and libraries in Australia, Europe and North America. Spunti e ricerche's Editorial Board is composed of Italianists from Melbourne tertiary institutions and is assisted by an Advisory Board made up of Italianists.

The Italianist
The Italianist first appeared in 1981, and publishes articles on all aspects of Italian art, culture, and life from the Middle Ages to the present.

Quaderni d'Italianistica
Quaderni d'Italianistica is the official journal of the CAIS (Canadian Association for Italian Studies), formerly CSIS (Canadian Society for Italian Studies). Quaderni d'Italianistica is peer-reviewed and publishes two yearly issues of essays and book reviews in English, French, or Italian on any aspect of Italian language, literature, culture and pedagogy. Quaderni also embraces a transnational perspective, addressing questions of race, gender, and diasporic communities.

See also
 Serena Professor of Italian
 Casa Italiana Zerilli Marimò
 Casa Italiana
 Italian Renaissance

References

External links
American Association for Italian Studies: AAIS
Association for the Study of Modern Italy: ASMI
Canadian Society for Italian Studies: CSIS
Society for Italian Studies: SIS
Spunti e ricerche; rivista d'italianistica Journal of Italian Studies
Modern Italy, official journal of ASMI
Journal of Modern Italian Studies
Contemporary Italian Politics
Association of Professional Italianists in South Africa / Associazione Professori d’Italiano in Sudafrica: API
 

Library guides to Italian studies
 
 

European studies
Higher education-related lists
Italian culture
Romance studies